"Voices" is a song performed by Congolese-Swedish singer Tusse, composed by Joy Deb, Linnea Deb, Jimmy "Joker" Thörnfeldt and Anderz Wrethov. The song competed in Melodifestivalen 2021, where it made it through to the final on 13 March 2021. The song received the most points from both the viewers and the international jury in the final and won the final with 175 points, 57 points ahead of the runner-up. It represented Sweden in the Eurovision Song Contest 2021 in Rotterdam. Following the song's win at Melodifestivalen, it ascended to number one on the Swedish Sverigetopplistan chart. It was later certified Platinum by the Swedish Recording Industry Association.

In the semi-final, the song managed to qualify for the final on 22 May. In the final the song placed 14th, breaking Sweden's streak of top 10 entries since 2013 thus giving the country their lowest result in eight years.

Charts

Weekly charts

Year-end charts

References

2021 songs
2021 singles
English-language Swedish songs
Melodifestivalen songs of 2021
Number-one singles in Sweden
Songs written by Jimmy Thörnfeldt
Songs written by Joy Deb
Songs written by Linnea Deb
Songs written by Wrethov
Eurovision songs of 2021
Eurovision songs of Sweden
Universal Music Group singles